The 1962 Campeonato Paulista da Divisão Especial, organized by the Federação Paulista de Futebol, was the 61st season of São Paulo's top professional football league. Santos won the title for the 7th time. Taubaté was relegated and the top scorer was Santos's Pelé with 37 goals.

Championship
The championship was disputed in a double-round robin system, with the team with the most points winning the title and the team with the fewest points being relegated.

Top Scores

References

Campeonato Paulista seasons
Paulista